Does Humor Belong in Music? may refer to:

 Does Humor Belong in Music? (album), a live album by Frank Zappa
 Does Humor Belong in Music? (video), a Frank Zappa concert video